The 1995 Segunda División Peruana, the second division of Peruvian football (soccer), was played by 12 teams. the tournament winner, Guardia Republicana was promoted to the Primera División Peruana. The tournament was played on a home-and-away round-robin basis. Mixto Estudiantil withdrew before the tournament began. All their matches were considered losses by 0-2.

Results

Standings

External links
 RSSSF

Peruvian Segunda División seasons
Peru2
2